Hasten Down the Wind is the seventh studio album by singer-songwriter Linda Ronstadt. Released in 1976, it became her third straight million-selling album. Ronstadt was the first female artist to accomplish this feat. The album earned her a Grammy Award for Best Pop Vocal Performance, Female in 1977, her second of 13 Grammys. It represented a slight departure from 1974's Heart Like a Wheel and 1975's Prisoner in Disguise in that she chose to showcase new songwriters over the traditional country rock sound she had been producing up to that point. A more serious and poignant album than its predecessors, it won critical acclaim.

Hasten Down the Wind contained two major hit singles:  Ronstadt's covers of Buddy Holly's "That'll Be the Day" (US Pop #11, Country #27) and her reworking of the late Patsy Cline's 1961 hit, "Crazy", reaching #6 on the US Country chart in early 1977.

The album showcased songs from artists such as Warren Zevon ("Hasten Down the Wind") and Karla Bonoff ("Someone to Lay Down Beside Me", US #42, Easy Listening #38), both of whom would soon be making a name for themselves in the singer-songwriter world. The album included a cover of a cover: "The Tattler" by Washington Phillips, which Ry Cooder had re-arranged for his 1974 album Paradise and Lunch. The album also included two songs co-written by Ronstadt, including one in Spanish (her first recorded foray into Spanish music, more than a decade before she released her first fully-Spanish album).

Her third album to go platinum, Hasten Down the Wind spent several weeks in the top three of the Billboard album charts. It was also the second of four number 1 Country albums for her.

Track listing

Personnel 

 Linda Ronstadt – lead vocals, backing vocals (1,2, 3, 8, 12), handclaps (4)
 Andrew Gold – acoustic piano (1, 6, 9, 11, 12), organ (1, 3), ARP String Ensemble (1, 3), acoustic guitar (1, 3, 10), finger cymbal (1, 3), backing vocals (1, 2, ft 4, 7, 8), electric piano (2, 8), sleigh bells (2), handclaps (2), electric guitar (4, 9), bass guitar (5), harmony vocals (5), tambourine (6), lead guitar (8), rhythm guitar (8), cowbell (8), clavinet (12)
 Clarence McDonald – acoustic piano (10)
 Dan Dugmore – electric guitar (1, 2, 11, 12), steel guitar (5, 8, 9, 10)
 Waddy Wachtel – electric guitar (3, 4, 6), acoustic guitar (5), "reggae" lead guitar (8)
 Kenny Edwards – bass guitar (1–4, 6, 8–12), backing vocals (1, 2, 4, 7), mandolin (2), string arrangements (2), acoustic guitar (5), harmony vocals (5)
 Mike Botts – drums (1, 2, 4, 8–12)
 Russ Kunkel – drums (3, 5, 6)
 Peter Asher – handclaps (2), shaker (2, 8), tambourine, (2, 3), wood block (4), cowbell (8), backing vocals (8)
 David Campbell – string arrangements and conductor (1, 2, 6, 9, 12)
 Charles Veal – concertmaster (1, 9, 12), violin (2), viola (6)
 Dennis Karmazyn – cello (1, 6, 9, 12)
 Ken Yerke – violin (2)
 Richard Feves – double bass (6)
 Paul Polivnick  – viola (6)
 Karla Bonoff – backing vocals (3, 12)
 Wendy Waldman – backing vocals (3, 12)
 Don Henley – harmony vocals (6)
 Herb Pedersen – backing vocals (8)
 Pat Henderson – backing vocals (9), choir vocals (11)
 Becky Louis – backing vocals (9), choir vocals (11)
 Sherlie Matthews – backing vocals (9), choir vocals (11)
 Gerald Garrett – choir vocals (11)
 Jim Gilstrap – choir vocals (11)
 Ron Hicklan – choir vocals (11)
 Clydie King – choir vocals (11)
 Bill Thedford – choir vocals (11)

Production 
 Peter Asher – producer 
 Val Garay – recording, mixing 
 Bernie Grundman – mastering 
 Mastered at A&M Mastering Studios (Hollywood, California).
 John Kosh – cover design
 Ethan Russell – photography

Charts

Certifications

References

1976 albums
Linda Ronstadt albums
Albums produced by Peter Asher
Asylum Records albums
Grammy Award for Best Female Pop Vocal Performance